Hyron Diego Andrews (born 6 July 1995) is a South African rugby union player for the  in Super Rugby and in the Currie Cup. His regular position is lock.

Career

At high school level, Andrews represented the Blue Bulls at the Under-16 Grant Khomo Week in 2011 and at the premier South African high school rugby competition, the Under-18 Craven Week, in both 2012 and 2013. He made three appearances on both occasions and scored two tries in the 2013 competition. He was also named in the South Africa Schools side in 2012, but failed to make any appearances.

He started their next four matches in the competition as the Sharks XV finished sixth in the Southern Section of the competition.

Andrews was named in a 37-man training squad for the South Africa national under-20 rugby union team and was included in the squad that embarked on a two-match tour of Argentina. He was an unused replacement in their 25–22 victory over Argentina, but started their 39–28 victory a few days later.

Upon the team's return, Andrews was named in the final squad for the 2015 World Rugby Under 20 Championship. He didn't get any game time in their first of three matches in Pool B of the competition, a 33–5 win against hosts Italy, but was used as a replacement in their 40–8 win against Samoa and their 46–13 win over Australia to help South Africa finish top of Pool B to qualify for the semi-finals with the best record pool stage of all the teams in the competition. He was named on the bench for their semi-final match against England, but did not come on as South Africa lost 20–28 to be eliminated from the competition by England for the second year in succession. He also didn't feature in their third-place play-off match against France, which South Africa won 31–18 to secure third place in the competition.

References

South African rugby union players
Living people
1995 births
Sportspeople from Paarl
Rugby union locks
Sharks (Currie Cup) players
South Africa Under-20 international rugby union players
Sharks (rugby union) players
Rugby union players from the Western Cape